Anne Mogensdotter Løset (died 1679) was a Norwegian woman who was tried for alleged sorcery, convicted and executed by burning.

She was probably born at Sunnmøre, and was executed at Rovde in December 1679. Her biography is known from records from Thing gatherings in 1679.

Several witnesses held her responsible for their miserable health condition. Anne Løset long denied all accusations. After strong pressure from her clergyman she finally pleaded guilty and confessed everything, including a Christmas Mass with Satan at Dovrefjell in 1678.

In the district of Sunnmøre a total of 19 witch trials from the 17th century are documented.

References

17th-century births
1679 deaths
People from Møre og Romsdal
17th-century executions by Norway
People executed for witchcraft
Executed Norwegian women
Executed Norwegian people
Norwegian torture victims
17th-century Norwegian people
People executed by Norway by burning
17th-century Norwegian women
Witch trials in Norway